, is a town located in Hidaka Subprefecture, Hokkaido, Japan.

As of April 2017, the town has an estimated population of 4,482, with 2,242 households, and a density of 12 persons per km2. The total area is 364.33 km2.

The local economy is dominated by agriculture, including breeding horses for racing, tourism and the harvesting of wild konbu.

Samani is at the end of the  JR Hokkaido Hidaka Main Line that runs from Tomakomai. However, no services have operated between  station and  station since January 2015, due to storm damage. Plans to repair the suspended section of the line have been abandoned, due to high repair costs and low ridership, and the segment will be formally closed on 1 April 2021. A bus service will replace this section.

Stations in Samani:  -  - 

One of the best known sites in Samani is the  that sit just offshore. They are known by this name, meaning Parents-and-Child, because they are a formation of two larger rocks and smaller one. Oya-ko is nesting site for cormorants and other sea birds.

 is next to the town. An onsen (hot spring resort) is at the base of the mountain, which is a popular climb among tourists and locals.

Culture

Mascots

Kanran-kun is a hard willing green peridotite fairy who has a strong sense of justice and will but he is sloppy. He loves to climb mountains and play drums. His favorite food is whelk curry. His quote is "three years on a stone" (石の上にも三年). He is also a huge fan of rock music and can cook dried kelp. 
Apoi-chan is a bright and gentle pink flower fairy who veterinarian. She is also a skilled tenipon player. Her favorite food is strawberry ice cream. Her mantra is "10 people, 10 colors" (十人十色). Her favourite song is "Sekai ni Hitotsu Dake no Hana" by SMAP. She can energize people.

References

External links

Official Website 

Towns in Hokkaido